Brian Gartland (born 4 November 1986) is an Irish former professional footballer who played as a centre-back.

Club career
Gartland was at Bray Wanderers in 2005 and won their U21 Player of the Year the following year, before moving to Shelbourne at the start of 2007. Brian scored on his League of Ireland debut on the opening day of the 2007 League of Ireland season  and after one season at Tolka Park moved to Monaghan United in 2008, where he won the 2009 Supporters Club Player of the Year. In January 2011 he moved north of the border for a -year spell with Portadown in the Irish League.

Brian Gartland joined Dundalk during the July transfer window in 2013 having left Irish League side Portadown. Dundalk manager Stephen Kenny had moved to add Gartland to his squad to strengthen his centre-half options.

Gartland made his Dundalk debut when entering as an early second-half substitute in the 3-0 win at home to Bohemians on 12 July 2013. On his first full start, Brian scored his first goal for Dundalk with against Cork on 19 July 2013 in Turners Cross. During the second half of the 2013 season, he formed a formidable partnership with Andy Boyle at the heart of the defence, and was a key player in Dundalk's title challenge - playing 12 matches and scoring twice.

On 18 October 2013, Gartland signed a fresh one-year deal to keep him at Oriel Park for the 2014 season. In his first full season at the club, he scored 11 goals on the way to helping the side clinch the League title. He agreed a new two-year deal in November 2014 and in 2015 he was a key member of the side that claimed the Double. During the 2014–15 UEFA Europa League Gartland scored against Jeunesse Esch

Gartland remained a near ever present in the side for Dundalk's three-in-a-row League title success in 2016 and signed a new deal to stay at the club at the end of the 2017 season. Having been made club captain in 2018 after injury to Stephen O'Donnell, Gartland lifted both the League title and the FAI Cup that season, as the club completed its second Double in four seasons.

Gartland was part of the first Irish side to reach the play-off round of the UEFA Champions League in August 2016 and qualified for the Europa League group stages. Gartland scored against Rosenborg BK in the 2017–18 UEFA Champions League

He also played regularly in 2020–21 UEFA Europa League group stage.
Gartland picked up a serious injury to his Anterior cruciate ligament on 2 April 2021, 6 minutes into his first league appearance of the season, against Shamrock Rovers at Tallaght Stadium.

Honours
Dundalk
Premier Division: 5
2014, 2015, 2016, 2018, 2019
FAI Cup: 3
2015, 2018, 2020
League of Ireland Cup: 3
2014, 2017, 2019
President's Cup: 3
2015, 2019, 2021
Champions Cup: 1
2019
Leinster Senior Cup: 1
2014–15

References

Association footballers from Dublin (city)
Republic of Ireland association footballers
Dundalk F.C. players
Portadown F.C. players
Monaghan United F.C. players
Shelbourne F.C. players
Bray Wanderers F.C. players
League of Ireland players
1986 births
Living people
Association football central defenders
NIFL Premiership players